This is a list of Cal State Los Angeles Diablos football players in the NFL Draft.

Key

Draft picks

References

Cal State Los Angeles

Los Angeles Diablos in the NFL Draft
Cal State Los Angeles Diablos NFL Draft